Wesley is a town in Washington County, Maine, United States. The town was named after John Wesley, founder of the English Methodist movement. The population was 122 at the 2020 census.

Geography

Climate
This climatic region is typified by large seasonal temperature differences, with warm to hot (and often humid) summers and cold (sometimes severely cold) winters.  According to the Köppen Climate Classification system, Wesley has a humid continental climate, abbreviated "Dfb" on climate maps.

Roads
Wesley is at the intersection of state routes 9 and 192.

Demographics

2010 census
As of the census of 2010, there were 98 people, 50 households, and 31 families living in the town. The racial makeup of the town was 96.9% White, 1.0% Asian, and 2.0% from two or more races.

There were 50 households, of which 14.0% had children under the age of 18 living with them, 52.0% were married couples living together, 10.0% had a female householder with no husband present, and 38.0% were non-families. 26.0% of all households were made up of individuals, and 18% had someone living alone who was 65 years of age or older. The average household size was 1.96 and the average family size was 2.29.

The median age in the town was 54.5 years. 10.2% of residents were under the age of 18; 2% were between the ages of 18 and 24; 17.2% were from 25 to 44; 38.8% were from 45 to 64; and 31.6% were 65 years of age or older. The gender makeup of the town was 53.1% male and 46.9% female.

2000 census
As of the census of 2000, there were 114 people, 51 households, and 34 families living in the town. The population density was 2.3 people per square mile (0.9/km). There were 150 housing units at an average density of 3.0 per square mile (1.2/km). The racial makeup of the town was 97.37% White, 1.75% Native American, and 0.88% from two or more races.

There were 51 households, out of which 27.5% had children under the age of 18 living with them, 52.9% were married couples living together, 9.8% had a female householder with no husband present, and 33.3% were non-families. 27.5% of all households were made up of individuals, and 9.8% had someone living alone who was 65 years of age or older. The average household size was 2.24 and the average family size was 2.74.

In the town, the population was spread out, with 25.4% under the age of 18, 2.6% from 18 to 24, 23.7% from 25 to 44, 28.1% from 45 to 64, and 20.2% who were 65 years of age or older. The median age was 44 years. For every 100 females, there were 93.2 males. For every 100 females age 18 and over, there were 97.7 males.

The median income for a household in the town was $21,667, and the median income for a family was $20,833. Males had a median income of $21,750 versus $23,750 for females. The per capita income for the town was $11,314. There were 34.4% of families and 38.5% of the population living below the poverty line, including 46.7% of under eighteens and 23.5% of those over 64.

References

Towns in Washington County, Maine
Towns in Maine